The Church of Mid-Pentecost is a Russian Orthodox church in Rostov-on-Don, Russia that belongs to the Diocese of Rostov and Novocherkassk.

History

The first mentioning about the church dates to 1824―1829, when it was built in the cossack village of Nizhne-Gnilovskaya on the funds of local dwellers. This church was being built for about five years. In 1829, after the end of construction works, it was consecrated in honor of the Resurrection of Christ, but at the request of parishioners and with the blessing of Bishop Epiphany of Voronezh and Cherkassy, the patronal celebration in the church was attributed to Mid-Pentecost. Therefore, the church received the name of Mid-Pentecost. By 1890, the single-domed church had a belfry over the vestibule, and the churchyard had a lodge and a chancery. From 1823, there had been functioning a two-year boys school, and from 1878 ― a primary school for girls.

In 1892–1893, when a cholera outbreak in Rostov-on-Don passed away, a chapel dedicated to Hodegetria of Smolensk was built to honor deliverance from the disease.

In 1908–1909, two chapels were built and the walls were painted inside.

During Russian Civil War, in Autumn of 1918, the church became a city center of the White movement.

In 1933, the church was closed and gradually destroyed. Its bell tower was used for parachute training for several years. The church building was almost totally destroyed in 1940, but in 1942 divine services continued to be held in the cellar. In 1959 they were prohibited at all and all the remaining church property was expropriated. At the building of the former parish school a cinema theatre was opened.

The church began to be renovated in 1996. In 1999, liturgies were already started to be held there.

References

Churches in Rostov-on-Don
Churches completed in 1829
Cultural heritage monuments in Rostov-on-Don
Cultural heritage monuments of regional significance in Rostov Oblast
Russian Orthodox church buildings in Russia